"Hedonism (Just Because You Feel Good)" is a song by British rock group Skunk Anansie. It was released in January 1997 as a single from their second album, Stoosh (1996). The song reached number 13 on the UK Singles Chart and was certified silver by the British Phonographic Industry (BPI) in February 2019 for sales and streams exceeding 200,000. It also proved to be a top-10 hit in the Netherlands, Norway, and Switzerland. In Iceland, the song peaked at number one. It is regarded as one of Skunk Anansie's most known singles and was a popular choice at concerts. Skin performs a version of the song at many of her solo gigs.

Critical reception
David Sinclair from The Times wrote, "Wild-woman singer Skin shows her gentler side, at last, on this rock ballad. The most obvious hit yet from their album Stoosh."

Music video
The accompanying music video for "Hedonism (Just Because You Feel Good)" was directed by Thomas Krygier, who also directed "Brazen (Weep)". It shows the band performing in a flat, followed by cutaway scenes that shows various people's instincts in the same flat. The video contained computer-generated imagery to manipulate some of the people's faces in the flat to show their emotions. The video also caused minor controversy when scenes contained two women tongue kiss.

Track listings
 UK CD1 and Australian CD single
 "Hedonism (Just Because You Feel Good)"
 "So Sublime"
 "Let It Go"
 "Strong"

 UK CD2
 "Hedonism (Just Because You Feel Good)" (allegedly acoustic mix)
 "Song Recovery"
 "Contraband"
 "I Don't Believe"

 UK cassette single
 "Hedonism (Just Because You Feel Good)"
 "So Sublime"

 French CD single
 "Hedonism (Just Because You Feel Good)"
 "Hedonism (Just Because You Feel Good)" (allegedly acoustic mix)

Charts

Weekly charts

Year-end charts

Certifications

References

1990s ballads
1996 songs
1997 singles
Number-one singles in Iceland
One Little Indian Records singles
Rock ballads
Skunk Anansie songs
Song recordings produced by Garth Richardson
Songs written by Skin (musician)